Khan Shatyr is a transparent tent located in Astana, the capital city of Kazakhstan. Built in a neo-futurist style, the architectural project was unveiled by the first President of Kazakhstan Nursultan Nazarbayev on December 9, 2006.

Under the tent, an area larger than 10 football stadiums, is an urban-scale park, shopping and entertainment venue with squares and cobbled streets, a boating river, shopping centre, minigolf and indoor beach resort. The fabric roof is constructed from ETFE-cushions provided by Vector Foiltec, suspended on a network of cables strung from a central spire.

Following the construction of the Palace of Peace and Reconciliation (opened in 2006), a glass pyramid, the Khan Shatyr Entertainment Center was the second national project in Astana designed by UK architect Norman Foster (of Foster and Partners), (Partners in Charge Filo Russo and Peter Ridley), and UK engineers Buro Happold led by Mike Cook. Construction documentation architects were Linea and Gultekin. The construction of the tent-city was the responsibility of the Turkish company Sembol.

After a series of delays, the main mast was eventually erected in December 2008, and the whole complex was completed and opened on July 5, 2010, 70th birthday of Kazakhstan's president, Nursultan Nazarbayev. Andrea Bocelli gave a concert for the occasion, with guests including the President of Russia, Dmitry Medvedev; the President of Ukraine, Viktor Yanukovych; the President of Turkey, Abdullah Gül; the President of Belarus, Alexander Lukashenko; the President of Armenia, Serzh Sargsyan; the President of Tajikistan, Emomalii Rahmon; the President of Kyrgyzstan, Roza Otunbayeva; the Crown prince of Abu Dhabi, Mohammed bin Zayed Al Nahyan; and the King of Jordan, Abdullah II.

References

External links
Khan Shatyr
BBC News on the Giant Tent-City
fosterandpartners.com
vector-foiltec.com/
 ANM GROUP INTERNATIONAL
Megastructures: World's Biggest Tent
Google Maps
Abassayoh on Khan Shatyr

Foster and Partners buildings
Tensile membrane structures
Buildings and structures in Astana
Music venues in Kazakhstan
Buildings and structures completed in 2010
Event venues established in 2010
2010 establishments in Kazakhstan
Culture in Astana
Tourist attractions in Astana